Jure Primorac (born 10 December 1981) is a Croatian former professional football player.

He played professionally in Ligue 2 for AS Cannes and US Créteil-Lusitanos.

He is the son of Boro Primorac.

External links
 Career summary by playerhistory.com 

1981 births
Living people
French footballers
Ligue 2 players
AS Cannes players
US Créteil-Lusitanos players
NK Čelik Zenica players
Footballers from Split, Croatia
US Ivry players
Croatian emigrants to France
Association football defenders